Marisa Papen is a Belgian model and naturist, known for posing nude in unconventional and controversial locations.

Life 
Papen was born in Limburg. After high school, she studied marketing. In 2015 she started working as a model and was photographed for Playboy in Germany (2017), Mexico (2019, with Ana Dias) and Portugal (2016). In 2016 she published a calendar in which she addressed the problem of plastic in the ocean. A year later, Papen made headlines all over the world when she was photographed naked in Egyptian temples. Because of this, she was arrested for taking nude photos, which results in a criminal record in Egypt. The photographer deleted the photos before arrest, so they were released. In 2018, she posed nude for photographs in the Vatican and Jerusalem.

References

External links
 Homepage de Marisa Papen

Living people
Year of birth missing (living people)